Ezekiel 9 is the ninth chapter of the Book of Ezekiel in the Hebrew Bible or the Old Testament of the Christian Bible. This book contains the prophecies attributed to the prophet/priest Ezekiel, and is one of the Books of the Prophets. This chapter, sub-titled "The Wicked Are Slain" in the New King James Version, contains God's "judgment on the idolaters"  who defiled the temple in Jerusalem.

Text
The original text was written in the Hebrew language. This chapter is divided into 11 verses.

Textual witnesses
Some early manuscripts containing the text of this chapter in Hebrew are of the Masoretic Text tradition, which includes the Codex Cairensis (895), the Petersburg Codex of the Prophets (916), Aleppo Codex (10th century), Codex Leningradensis (1008).

There is also a translation into Koine Greek known as the Septuagint, made in the last few centuries BC. Extant ancient manuscripts of the Septuagint version include Codex Vaticanus (B; B; 4th century), Codex Alexandrinus (A; A; 5th century) and Codex Marchalianus (Q; Q; 6th century).

Verse 2

Suddenly six men came from the direction of the upper gate, which faces north, each with his battle-ax in his hand. One man among them was clothed with linen and had a writer’s inkhorn at his side. They went in and stood beside the bronze altar.
The high priest's garments are of linen, but these linen garments "mark the man’s divine sanctity and eminence, not [his] priestly rank".

Verse 4

 And the Lord said unto him, Go through the midst of the city, through the midst of Jerusalem, and set a mark upon the foreheads of the men that sigh and that cry for all the abominations that be done in the midst thereof. "Mark" (Hebrew: תו ): interpreted as a "sign of exemption from judgment" (also in Ezekiel 9:6). The word "tāw" for "mark" is also for calling the last letter in Hebrew alphabet; in Paleo-Hebrew alphabet and Phoenician alphabet it was written "somewhat like the English X," (compare ). The Benedictine writer Bernard de Montfaucon noted that some ancient Samaritan coins have the letter "thau" on them in the form of a cross, as did the coins of the Maccabees. Gesenius wrote that the Arabic equivalent of this word refers to "a sign in the form of a cross branded on the thigh or neck of horses and camels".

Verse 6
 “Utterly slay old and young men, maidens and little children and women; but do not come near anyone on whom is the mark; and begin at My sanctuary.” So they began with the elders who were before the temple. (NKJV)
 "On whom is the mark": gives a hint that some people will survive ("such as those with the special mark on their foreheads"). 
 "Mark": see notes on Ezekiel 9:4.

Verse 11
 Just then, the man clothed with linen, who had the inkhorn at his side, reported back and said, “I have done as You commanded me.” (NKJV)
 "With linen" (Hebrew: הבדים ha-''): refers to "white linen garments."

See also

Related Bible parts: Hebrews 1, Revelation 2 Revelation 7, Revelation 9, Revelation 14, Revelation 22

Notes

References

Sources

External links

Jewish
Ezekiel 9 Hebrew with Parallel English
Ezekiel 9 Hebrew with Rashi's Commentary

Christian
Ezekiel 9 English Translation with Parallel Latin Vulgate

09